Art Mac Cathmhaoil (Sometimes Anglicised to Arthur MacCawell) was a priest in Ireland during the late 14th and early 15th centuries.

He was Archdeacon of Clogher from 1367 to 1389; and Bishop of Clogher from then until his  death on 10 August 1432.

References

14th-century Roman Catholic bishops in Ireland
15th-century Roman Catholic bishops in Ireland
Pre-Reformation bishops of Clogher
Archdeacons of Clogher
1432 deaths